The 1979–80 Liga Leumit season saw Maccabi Netanya, with the club's David Lavi finishing as the league's top scorer with 18 goals. Hakoah Ramat Gan, Beitar Tel Aviv and Beitar Jerusalem were all relegated to Liga Artzit.

Final table

Results

References
Israel - List of final tables RSSSF

Liga Leumit seasons
Israel
1